Polina Olegovna Anikeeva (born 1982) is a Russian-born American materials scientist who is a Professor of Material Science & Engineering as well as Brain & Cognitive Sciences at the Massachusetts Institute of Technology (MIT). She also holds faculty appointments in the McGovern Institute for Brain Research and Research Laboratory of Electronics at MIT. Her research is centered on developing tools for studying the underlying molecular and cellular bases of behavior and neurological diseases. She was awarded the 2018 Vilcek Foundation Prize for Creative Promise in Biomedical Science, the 2020 MacVicar Faculty Fellowship at MIT, and in 2015 was named a MIT Technology Review Innovator Under 35.

Early life and education 
Anikeeva was born in Saint Petersburg, Russia (then Leningrad, Soviet Union). She studied biophysics at St. Petersburg State Polytechnic University, where she worked under the guidance of Tatiana Birshtein, a polymer physicist at the Institute of Macromolecular Compounds of the Russian Academy of Sciences. During her undergraduate studies she also completed an exchange program at ETH Zurich. After graduating in 2003, Anikeeva spent a year working in the Physical Chemistry Division at Los Alamos National Laboratory where she developed photovoltaic cells based on quantum dots (QDs). In 2004, she enrolled in the Materials Science and Engineering Ph.D. program at MIT and joined Vladimir Bulović's laboratory of organic electronics. Working with Bulović, she engineered light-emitting diodes based on quantum dots and organic semiconductors. While a graduate student, she was the lead author on a seminal paper that reported a method for generating QD light-emitting devices with electroluminescence tunable over the entire visible spectrum (460 nm to 650 nm). Her doctoral research was commercialized by the display industry, and acquired by a manufacturer that would eventually become part of Samsung.

Research and career 
Anikeeva moved to Stanford University and was appointed to Karl Deisseroth's neuroscience laboratory as a Postdoctoral Scholar. The Deisseroth laboratory pioneered Optogenetics, a technique that utilizes light-sensitive ion channels such as Channelrhodopsins to modulate neuronal activity. Anikeeva worked on combining tetrodes, which are electronic modalities used to record neuronal activity, with optical waveguides to create optetrodes. These optoelectronic devices could be used to record the electrical activity invoked by light delivered through the waveguide, which became the precursor to the multi-functional fiber-based neural interfaces Anikeeva would later pioneer in her own laboratory at MIT.

After her postdoctoral studies in California, Anikeeva returned to Cambridge, Massachusetts as an AMAX Career Development Assistant Professor at MIT in 2011. The Anikeeva laboratory, which is also referred to as Bioelectronics@MIT, engineers tools to study and control the nervous system. Her laboratory has two main research themes. The first is using the thermal drawing technique, a process originally developed for applications such as fiber optics and textiles, to create flexible polymer, fiber-based neural interfaces. In 2015, Anikeeva and co-workers first reported these flexible neural interfaces, which are also referred to as neural probes, and demonstrated that they could combine optical, electronic, and microfluidic modalities into a single implantable device for chronic interrogation of the nervous system. These fibers are a more advanced and scalable technology than their optetrode precursors. Since then, Anikeeva and her students have created even more advanced neural interfaces that can be highly customized and include materials such as photoresists and hydrogels.

Anikeeva's second main research theme is using magnetic fields to wirelessly modulate neuronal activity. Unlike light, which has a limited penetration depth in biological tissues due to attenuation, weak alternating magnetic fields (AMFs) have minimal coupling to biological tissues due to tissues' low conductivity and negligible magnetic permeability. Magnetic nanomaterials can be engineered to heat up or rotate when in the presence of AMFs. If these nanomaterials are injected into biological tissues such as the brain and exposed to AMFs, they can be triggered to cause local thermal or mechanical stimulation. These technologies can be used to stimulate the TRP family of ion channels, including TRPV1 and TRPV4. In 2015, Anikeeva and her students demonstrated in a key paper published in Science that magneto-thermal stimulation with magnetic nanomaterials could be used for wireless deep brain stimulation. Follow up studies from the Anikeeva laboratory then extended this concept to stimulate mechanosensitive channels. Anikeeva and her colleagues have also shown that these magnetic nanomaterials can additionally be used to trigger drug delivery, hormone release, and for stimulating acid-sensing ion channels.

Anikeeva has given multiple talks on the technologies invented in her laboratory and neural interfaces more broadly, including in two TED talk given in 2015 and 2017.

Awards and honors 
 2013 National Science Foundation CAREER Award
 2013 National Academy of Engineering Frontiers of Engineering Symposium
2013 DARPA Young Faculty Award (YFA)
 2014 Dresselhaus Foundation Inaugural Award
 2015 Junior Bose Teaching Award
 2015 MIT Technology Review 35 Innovator Under 35
 2017 SPIE Women in Optics planner
 2018 Vilcek Prize for Creative Promise in Biomedical Science
2019 MITx Prize for Teaching and Learning in MOOCs
2020 MacVicar Faculty Fellowship

Selected publications

References 

1982 births
Women materials scientists and engineers
Scientists from Saint Petersburg
MIT School of Engineering alumni
MIT School of Engineering faculty
Peter the Great St. Petersburg Polytechnic University alumni
Russian expatriates in the United States
Living people